This is a complete list of appearances by members of the professional playing squad of UE Lleida during the 1997–98 season.

1998
Lleida
Lleida
Lleida